Randal Kevin Rushing (born September 9, 1963) is an American Republican politician. He is a member of the Mississippi House of Representatives from the 78th District, being first elected in 2011.

Rushing resides in Decatur, Mississippi.

References

1963 births
Living people
People from Carthage, Mississippi
Republican Party members of the Mississippi House of Representatives
21st-century American politicians